Urreligion is a postulated "original" or "oldest" form of religious tradition (the German prefix  expressing the idea of "original", "primal", "primitive", "elder", "primeval", or ""). The concept contrasts with that of organized religion, as found (for example) in the theocracies of the early urban cultures of the Ancient Near East or in world religions as they have developed.
The term Urreligion originated in the context of German Romanticism.

History
Friedrich Creuzer put forward the notion of a monotheistic primeval religion in 1810 – an idea taken up by other authors of the Romantic period, such as J. J. Bachofen, but decidedly opposed by Johann Heinrich Voss. Goethe, in a conversation with Eckermann on 11 March 1832, discussed the human Urreligion, which he characterized as "pure nature and [pure] reason, of divine origin".
The final scene of his Faust Part Two (1832) has been taken as evoking "the 'Urreligion' of mankind".

Often used in the sense of natural religion or indigenous religion, the religious behaviour of pre-modern tribal societies such as shamanism, animism and ancestor worship (e.g. Australian aboriginal mythology), the term Urreligion has also been used by adherents of various religions to back up the claim that their own religion is somehow "primeval" or "older" than competing traditions. In the context of a given religious faith, literal belief in a creation may be the base of primality. (e.g. Biblical literalism, or literal belief in the Hindu Puranas).

In particular, Urmonotheismus comprises the historical claim that primeval religion was monotheistic. Some have rejected this hypothesis, and certain Christian apologetics circles defend it.

Nineteenth-century Germanic mysticism sometimes claimed that the Germanic runes bore testimony of a primeval religion. Some more recent new religious movements that claim to restore primeval religion include Godianism and Umbanda.

See also
 Ancient Semitic religion
 Paleolithic religion
 Perennial philosophy
 Prehistoric religion
 Proto-religion (disambiguation)
 Proto-Indo-European religion
 Evolutionary origin of religions

References

Prehistoric religion
History of religion studies
Superlatives in religion